A Surtseyan eruption is an explosive style of volcanic eruption that takes place in shallow seas or lakes when rapidly rising and fragmenting hot magma interacts explosively with water and with water-steam-tephra slurries. The eruption style is named after an eruption off the southern coast of Iceland in 1963 that caused the emergence of a new volcanic island, Surtsey.

Surtseyan eruptions are hydromagmatic eruptions, in that they are violently explosive as a result of vigorous interaction between rising magma and lake or sea water. The magma is commonly basaltic and fragments into small pyroclasts (known as 'ash' and 'lapilli'), and these accumulate around the crater to form a small cone or ring-shaped heap. Volcanoes of this type are known as 'tuff cones' and 'tuff rings' because the volcanic ash of which they are made soon solidifies by chemical reaction into a hard rock known as 'tuff'.

Surtseyan eruptions are characteristically unsteady, with phases of rapid repeated short, violent explosions separated by more quiescent phases dominated by steam generation and condensation. Ash and lapilli are emplaced by ash fall (frequently moist or wet), and by short-duration, pyroclastic density currents. The resultant deposits are characteristically well bedded with abundant evidence for moist conditions (e.g. ash aggregates, vesiculated ash layers, and soft-state deformed layers). Much of the wet tephra repeatedly slumps back down into the volcano's crater to be re-ejected by further watery explosions.

Characteristics

Although similar in nature to phreatomagmatic eruptions, there are several specific characteristics:

Physical nature of magma: basaltic.
Character of explosive activity: violent ejection of solid, warm fragments of new magma; continuous or rhythmic explosions; base surges.
Nature of effusive activity: short, locally pillowed, lava flows (which may be rare).
Nature of dominant ejecta: lithic, blocks and ash; often accretionary lapilli; spatter, fusiform bombs and lapilli absent.
Structures built around vent: tuff rings

Examples of Surtseyan eruptions

 Bogoslof Island - Alaska, United States, 1796
 Fire Island - Alaska, United States, 1796
Graham Island - Sicily, Italy, 1831
 Anak Krakatau - Sunda Strait, Indonesia, 1927–1930 (with smaller eruptions continuing today) - further Surtseyan eruptions took place following the December 2018 eruption which left large sections of the volcano underwater
 Shōwa Iōjima - Iōjima, Kagoshima, Japan, 1934
 Capelinhos - Faial Island, Azores, 1957–1958
 Surtsey - Iceland, 1963
 Jólnir - Iceland, 1966
 Taal Volcano - Batangas, Philippines (last erupted in 2021)
 Zubair Group - Yemen, 2011–2012
 El Hierro - Canary Islands, 2011–2012 (see 2011–12 El Hierro eruption)
Fukutoku-Okanoba, Bonin Islands, Japan, 2021
Hunga Tonga-Hunga Ha'apai, Tonga, 2021—2022 (see 2022 Hunga Tonga–Hunga Ha'apai eruption and tsunami)

References

Kokelaar, B.P (1983) The Mechanisms of Surtseyan volcanism. Journal of the Geological Society, London.140, 939–944.

 
Volcanic eruption types